A crystal monochromator is a device in neutron and X-ray optics to select a defined wavelength of the radiation for further purpose on a dedicated instrument or beamline. It operates through the diffraction process according to Bragg's law. 

Similar devices are called crystal analyzer for the examination of scattered radiation.

Neutron instrumentation
X-ray instrumentation
Synchrotron instrumentation